"Rockin' With You" is a song by Epic Records recording artist Chris Rene. It appears on his debut EP, I'm Right Here, and was released as the third official single from the EP. It was written by the Rene siblings: Chris, Gabriel and Gina, an co-written/produced by Claude Kelly and Chuck Harmony. Rene released a preview of the song on his Facebook page.

Background
The single was written by Chris Rene, his brother and sister Gabriel and Gina, X Factor vocal coach Claude Kelly and producer Charles "Chuck Harmony" Harmon, and recorded in early 2012. At the 2012 MTV Video Music Awards, Chris teased that the song would become his third single from the album.  On September 13, 2012, Rene previewed a first listen of the single to his fans through his Facebook account. Rene says of the single: "this song is about basically a guy kind of being mischievous and not being truthful at the beginning, but what it really comes down to is he wants to be passionate about one girl and to have that love in his life. It's all about her. He's only rocking with her. I think a lot of people are going to feel it."

Critical reception
Michele Amabile Angermiller of The Hollywood Reporter took a positive liking to the song, saying that it "reveals a crisp, breezy sound that showcases Rene's honeyed vocals as well as his rapping skills and sweet romantic rhymes."

Live performances
Rene first performed the song live while embarking on his promotional tour. On August 12, 2012, Chris acoustically performed the televised debut of both "Trouble" and "Rockin With You" on VH1's Big Morning Buzz Live.

Credits and personnel
Credits are taken from I'm Right Here liner notes.

Lead vocals: Chris Rene
Background vocals: Claude Kelly
Written by: Claude Kelly, Chuck Harmony and Chris Rene
Recorded by: Ben "Bengineer" Chang
Mix engineer: Jaycen Joshua
Assisted by: Trehy Harris
Produced by: Chuck Harmony, Claude Kelly (co-produced & vocal production)
Production coordination: Conrad Martin and Carlos Taylor

Notes
According to BMI's website publishing, Gabriel and Gina Rene are co-writers on the track, contrary to the album liner notes.

References

2012 singles
Chris Rene songs
Epic Records singles
Songs written by Claude Kelly
Songs written by Chuck Harmony
Syco Music singles
2012 songs